Mark John Pollard (born 13 October 1979) is a Falkland Island politician who has served as a Member of the Legislative Assembly for the Stanley constituency since the 2017 general election.

Born in the UK to a fourth generation Falkland Islander and a Royal Marine who served in the Falklands, Pollard moved to the Islands in 1985. In 1997 he took part in a BBC World Service series to commemorate the 15th anniversary of the Falklands War.

After studying in the UK, Pollard returned to the Falklands and worked in telecommunications for 17 years. He briefly served as Chair of the Falklands Islands Association Sub-Committee.

References 

1979 births
Living people
Falkland Islands MLAs 2017–2021
Falkland Islands MLAs 2021–2025